The men's cruiserweight (86 kg/189.2 lbs) Thai-Boxing division at the W.A.K.O. European Championships 2006 in Skopje was the third heaviest of the male Thai-Boxing tournaments and involved ten fighters.  Each of the matches was three rounds of two minutes each and were fought under Thai-Boxing rules.

Due to the fact there were not enough men for a tournament of sixteen, seven of the men had a bye into the quarter finals.  Maxim Vinogradov of Russia was the tournament champion winning gold by defeating Austrian Aly Staubmann by unanimous decision in the final.  Siarhei Krauchanka from Belarus and Zaur Alekporov from Azerbaijan claimed bronze medals.

Results

Key

See also
List of WAKO Amateur European Championships
List of WAKO Amateur World Championships
List of male kickboxers

References

External links
 WAKO World Association of Kickboxing Organizations Official Site

W.A.K.O. European Championships 2006 (Skopje)